California Dreams is an American teen sitcom that aired on NBC. It was part of the network's Saturday morning block, TNBC, premiering on September 12, 1992. Created by writers Brett Dewey and Ronald B. Solomon, and executive produced by Peter Engel, all known for their work on Saved by the Bell, the series centers on the friendships of a group of teenagers (shifting toward a multi-ethnic makeup beginning with the show's second season) who form the fictional titular band. The series ran five seasons, airing its final episode on December 14, 1996. The series featured 40 original songs performed by the band throughout the show's run, primarily written by Steve Tyrell.

Episodes

Cast

Main

The Garrison family
 Brent Gore as Matt Garrison (1992–1994)
 Heidi Noelle Lenhart as Jenny Garrison (1992–1993)
 Michael Cutt as Richard Garrison (1992–1993, regular; 1993–1994, recurring)
 Gail Ramsey as Melody Garrison (1992–1993, regular; 1993, guest star)
 Ryan O'Neill as Dennis Garrison (1992–1993)

The band
 Kelly Packard as Tiffani Anne Smith
 William James Jones as Antoine Bethesda "Tony" Wicks
 Michael Cade as Sylvester Leslie "Sly" Winkle
 Jay Anthony Franke as Jacob Samuel "Jake" Sommers (1993–1996; singing voice performed by Barry Coffing)
 Jennie Kwan as Samantha Woo Deswanchoo (1993–1996)
 Aaron Jackson as Mark Winkle (1994–96; singing voice performed by Zachary Throne)
 Diana Uribe as Lorena Costa (1994–1996)

Recurring
 Brittney Powell as Randi Jo (1992–1993)
 Denise Dowse as Vice Principal McBride (1993–1994)
 Burke Bryant as Keith Del (1996)
 Earl Boen as Principal Wolfman Blumford (1994-1996)

Syndication
Reruns of California Dreams briefly aired on TBS in the late 1990s.

The show aired on The Children's Channel and later Trouble in the UK in the 1990s.

Home media
Shout! Factory released the first four seasons of California Dreams on DVD in Region 1 between 2009–2011. Seasons 3 and 4 were released as Shout! Factory Exclusives titles, available exclusively through their online store. As of 2016, Seasons 1-4 and The Best of... DVDs can be purchased on Amazon.  It is unknown if season 5 will be released.

On July 19, 2011, Mill Creek Entertainment released a ten-episode best-of set, The Best of California Dreams, a single-disc set that features episodes from the first three seasons.

♦ - Shout! Factory Exclusives title, sold exclusively through Shout's online store

Reception

Critical response
California Dreams was not well received critically. Rebecca Ascher-Walsh of Entertainment Weekly gave the series a grade of "F", and stated that "California Dreams can be accused of a lot of things, but originality isn’t one of them", and added that "California Dreams producer Franco E. Bario (who is also behind Saved by the Bell) may have good intentions, but it’s hard to imagine what they were." Los Angeles Times reviewer Lynne Heffley considered the show nothing more than "a Saved by the Bell clone set in an upscale beach town".

Awards and nominations

Cast reunion
The main cast members from the first two seasons of California Dreams reunited on Late Night with Jimmy Fallon on March 4, 2010, and played the show's theme song. The version they sang was a unique mash-up that featured both Heidi Noelle Lenhart and Jennie Kwan, who replaced Lenhart in Season 2. While present, Jay Anthony Franke was not a featured vocalist in the performance, given that he did not perform the singing voice of Jake Sommers. Aaron Jackson and Diana Uribe were not present.

References

External links
 

1992 American television series debuts
1996 American television series endings
1990s American high school television series
1990s American musical comedy television series
1990s American teen sitcoms
English-language television shows
Fictional musical groups
NBC original programming
Television series by Universal Television
Television shows set in Redondo Beach, California
TNBC
Television series about teenagers